David Nicholas Kaye (born 14 November 1959, in Huddersfield) was a professional footballer who played as a goalkeeper. He played in The Football League for Chester City.

Kaye began his career as an apprentice with Rotherham United, where he turned professional in November 1977. However, he failed to make a league appearance for the Millers and played non-league football for Mexborough Town before returning to The Football League when he joined Chester City in March 1985. He played in Chester's final seven games of the 1984–1985 season and then played three league games and a League Cup tie early the following season. Kaye lost his place to John Butcher and Chester then signed another goalkeeper in Ray Cashley.

Kaye moved on to Denaby United, before joining Scarborough. He played 17 times as they won the GM Vauxhall Conference title in 1986–1987 but did not play for the club again after promotion.

Honours

Scarborough

• GM Vauxhall Conference champions: 1986–1987 (17 apps).

References

1959 births
English footballers
English Football League players
National League (English football) players
Living people
Footballers from Huddersfield
Association football goalkeepers
Rotherham United F.C. players
Chester City F.C. players
Scarborough F.C. players
Mexborough Town F.C. players
Denaby United F.C. players